St. Hyacinth's Church is a Gothic building, formerly a church, in Vyborg, Leningrad Oblast, Russia.

It was built in the sixteenth century as a private church for members of the nobility, and it became a Roman Catholic church, dedicated to Saint Hyacinth, in 1802.

In 1970, the neglected and disused building was restored for use as a children's art school. It is now an art gallery.

The wrought iron railings here once belonged to Vyborg Cathedral.

References

Roman Catholic churches in Russia
Former churches in Russia
Buildings and structures in Vyborg
Cultural heritage monuments of federal significance in Leningrad Oblast